Aghowle Church is a medieval church and National Monument in County Wicklow, Ireland. It was one of the largest rural parish churches of its era. Aghowle is also a civil parish in the ancient barony of Shillelagh.Placenames Database of Ireland - Aglowle civil parish

Location

History

It is claimed that a monastery was founded on the site by Finnian of Clonard in the 6th century. They lived in Clocháin (beehive huts) around a wooden church The placename derives from the Irish for "field of apple trees." The present church dates to c. 1100 and was in use by the Church of Ireland until 1716–17. It is the principal ecclesiastical site of the northern Ui Felmeda. The large size of the structure indicates importance but the historical record is unclear why this parish was so important. 

Local legend tells of a "fugitive bell": apparently St Finnian erected a belfry at Aghowle, but later moved the bell to his other monastery at Clonard. One day it vanished and reappeared at Aghowle, and, despite several attempts at removing it, the bell kept on returning to Aghowle.

Church

The church is a long rectangular building with high gables of which the original north, east and west walls survive. The granite west doorway is lintelled on the outside and arched inside. It has Romanesque moulding on the outside and a draw-bar socket as well as pre Romanesque influences. Two round-headed windows in the east wall have hood mouldings on the outside supported by pillars.

St Finden's Cross

There are sunken panels in the shaft and underneath the arms. It dates to approximately the 10th century.

Font

Located on the eastern side of the cross is a large granite baptismal font (130 × 73 cm; 4′3″ × 2′5″) which is believed to be pre-Norman.  Local tradition claimed that water from the font could cure headaches.

It is generally accepted that the use of fonts within churches became firmly established during the 12th century in Ireland, reflecting the move to a parochial and diocesan organisation of the church and the changes in liturgical conventions that this brought. It was required that the sacraments take place in a fixed baptistery inside a church. In the field to the southeast is a large bullaun stone.

References

Churches in County Wicklow
Archaeological sites in County Wicklow
National Monuments in County Wicklow
Former churches in the Republic of Ireland